The third Season of X Factor started on 25 August 2012. The auditions were held in April/May 2012. The show was broadcast every Sunday. The judges were Sarah Connor, H.P. Baxxter, Sandra Nasic and Moses Pelham. In October 2012 Connor announced that she would not return to the judging panel for the Fourth Season.

There were four phases:
1. Auditions
2. Bootcamp
3. Judge's House
4. Live Shows

This year twelve acts had been a part of the live shows, but not in 3 categories like the two seasons before. In season 3 there were four categories. This year only the viewers voted who will go through. There wouldn't be a final showdown. The Live shows were cut to four, instead of eight.

Selection process

Applications and auditions
The first appeal for applicants for series 3 was broadcast during series 2 on 6 December 2012. Auditions in front of the judges for series 3 took place in Cologne, Berlin, Munich and Hamburg. After the acts sing in front of the judges, they would be eliminated or go through to the Bootcamp, but they need 3 of 4 votes to get through. The first audition was broadcast on 25 August 2012 on RTL Television. The rest aired on VOX every Sunday.

Bootcamp
The episodes of Bootcamp were broadcast in September 2012. It showed 92 acts attend to the Bootcamp. The acts were split into 4 groups, Boys, Girls, Over 25s and Groups and Bands, in which to perform in Düsseldorf. At first the 92 acts were reduced to the last 48, after a one-minute performance. The second phase was a duel where two acts of a category had to perform the same song and after this the judges decided which act got through to the Judges' House. The boys category had only five acts because both acts of one battle were send home and two of the girls category (Loredana Giarraputo & Klementine Hendrichs) have to repeat the battle in the judges house because the judges couldn't decided.

The 24 acts who reached the Judges' Houses:
Boys: Richard Geldner, Aron Verfinger, Lavien Partawie, Barne Heimbucher, Andrew Fischer
Girls: Lisa Aberer, Alexia Drawhorn, Fabienne Bender, Melissa Heiduk, Anna Hodowaniec, Loredana Giarraputo, Klementine Hendrichs
Over 25s: Colin Rich, Sascha Miskovic, Joey Jobbagy, Janine Smith, Björn Paulsen, Willy Hubbard
Groups and Bands: Mrs. Greenbird, Rune, Swave, aVid*, Josephine, Die Mayers

Judges' houses
Judges' houses, the final part of the selection process, was filmed in summer 2012. The episodes aired in October 2012. Judges decided alone which categories they want to get, so at the end of the Bootcamp they discussed their favourites. Baxxter the Girls, Nasic the Groups and Bands, Connor the Over 25s, and Pelham the Boys. At judges' houses each act performed one song for their mentor and his/her guest, before the last performance, they practiced the song with their mentor and his/her guest.

The twelve eliminated acts were:
Boys: Lavien Partawie, Aron Verfinger
Girls: Loredana Giarraputo, Fabienne Bender, Anna Hodowaniec, Alexia Drawhorn
Over 25s: Joey Jobbagy, Janine Smith, Sascha Miskovic
Groups and Bands: aVid*, Die Mayers, Swave

Contestants

Key:

 – Winner
 – Runner-up
 – Third place

Josephine consists of Christian (29), Daniel (33), Imme (30) & Victor (22).
Mrs. Greenbird consists of Sarah (28) & Steffen (36).
Rune consists of Marvin (18), Patrick (20), Sebastian (22) & Steffen (20).

Results table 

Contestants' colour key:
{|
|-
| – Boys
|-
| – Girls
|-
| – Over 25s
|- 
| – Groups and Bands
|-
| - Act did not perform
|-
| – the act got the fewest votes (per category) and leave the competition 
|-
| – the act got the fewest votes and has to sing again in the final showdown
|-
| – Contestant became the Runner-Up
|-
| – Highest (per category) Vote of a Week
|}

Live show details

Week 1 (4 November)

Week 2 (11 November)

Week 3: Semi-final (18 November)
 The two acts with the fewest votes had to sing again in the final showdown. Then the public decided between this two acts and the act with the lowest numbers of votes was eliminated.

Week 4: Final (25 November)
 The finalists performed three songs and one of them would be a performance with a celebrity musician.

Ratings

External links
 Official German X Factor site

References

Germany 03
2012 German television seasons